Sudha Murty ( Kulkarni; born 19 August 1951) is an Indian educator, author                                                                                                                   and philanthropist who is chairperson of the Infosys Foundation. She is married to the co-founder of Infosys, N. R. Narayana Murthy. Murty was awarded the Padma Shri, the fourth highest civilian award in India, for social work by the Government of India in 2006. Later in 2023, she was awarded the Padma Bhushan, the third highest civilian award in India.

Sudha Murty began her professional career in computer science and engineering. She is the chairperson of the Infosys Foundation and a member of the public health care initiatives of the Gates Foundation. She has founded several orphanages, participated in rural development efforts, supported the movement to provide all Karnataka government schools with computer and library facilities, and established Murty Classical Library of India at Harvard University.

Murty is best known for her philanthropy and her contribution to literature in Kannada and English. Dollar Bahu, a novel originally authored by her in Kannada and later translated into English as Dollar Bahu, was adapted as a televised dramatic series by Zee TV in 2001. Runa, a story by Sudha Murthy was adapted as a Marathi film, Pitruroon by director Nitish Bhardwaj. Sudha Murthy has also acted in the film as well as a Kannada film Prarthana.

Early life and education
Sudha Murty was born into a Deshastha Madhva Brahmin family on 19 August 1951 in Shiggaon, Haveri in Karnataka, India, the daughter of  R. H. Kulkarni,  a surgeon, and his wife Vimala Kulkarni,  a school teacher. She was raised by her parents and maternal grandparents. These childhood experiences form the historical basis for her first notable work entitled How I Taught My Grandmother to Read, Wise and Otherwise and Other Stories. Murty completed a B.Eng. in Electrical and Electronics Engineering from the B.V.B. College of Engineering & Technology (now known as KLE Technological University),and then a M.Eng. in Computer Science from the Indian Institute of Science

Career
Sudha Murty became the first female engineer hired at India's largest auto manufacturer TATA Engineering and Locomotive Company (TELCO). She joined the company as a Development Engineer in Pune and then worked in Mumbai & Jamshedpur as well. She had written a postcard to the company's Chairman complaining of the "men only" gender bias at TELCO. As a result, she was granted a special interview and hired immediately. She later joined Walchand Group of Industries at Pune as Senior Systems Analyst.

In 1996, she started Infosys Foundation and to date has been the Trustee of Infosys Foundation and a Visiting Professor at the PG Center of Bangalore University. She also taught at Christ University.

Sudha Murty has written and published many books which include novels, non-fiction, travelogues, technical books, and memoirs. Her books have been translated into all major Indian languages. She is also a columnist for English and Kannada newspapers.

Philanthropy

Murty's Infosys Foundation is a public charitable trust founded in 1996

Personal life
Sudha Murty married N. R. Narayana Murthy while employed as an engineer at TELCO in Pune. The couple have two children, including fashion designer Akshata Murty, who is married to the current British Prime Minister, Rishi Sunak.

Her siblings include Caltech astrophysicist Shrinivas Kulkarni and Jaishree Deshpande (wife of Gururaj Deshpande) who co-founded the Deshpande Center for Technological Innovation at MIT.

Awards 

2004: Raja-Lakshmi Award by Sri Raja-Lakshmi Foundation in Chennai
2006: India's fourth highest civilian award Padma Shri
2006: She also received the R.K. Narayana's Award for Literature.
2010: Daana Chintamani Attimabbe Award by Karnataka Government.
2011: Murthy was conferred honorary LL.D (Doctor of Laws) degrees for contributions to promote formal legal education and scholarship in India.
2013: Basava Shree-2013 Award was presented to Narayan Murthy & Sudha Murthy for their contributions to society.
2018: Murthy received the Crossword Book award in popular (Non-Fiction) category.
2019: IIT Kanpur awarded her Honorary Degree (Honoris Causa) of Doctor of Science.
2023: Murthy has been conferred with India's third highest civilian award Padma Bhushan by President of India.
National Award from Public Relation Society of India for outstanding Social Service to the Society
Award for Excellent Social Service by Rotary South – Hubli
"Millenium Mahila Shiromani" award
2023: Padma Bhushan by the Government of India

Bibliography

Books

Kannada

Dollar SoseRunaKaveri inda MekaangigeHakkiya TeradalliAthiriktheGuttondu HeluveMahashwetaTumlaNooniya SahasagaluSamanyralli AsamanyaruComputer lokadalliParidhiYashasviGuttondu HeluveAstitvaYerilitada DaariyalliSukhesini Mattu Itara Makkala KathegaluEnglish The Mother I Never KnewThree Thousand StitchesThe Man from the EggHere, There, EverywhereThe Magic of the Lost TempleThe Bird with Golden WingsHow I Taught My Grandmother to Read and Other StoriesThe Old Man And His GodWise and OtherwiseMahashwetaThe Day I Stopped Drinking MilkThe Serpent's RevengeGently Falls The BakulaHouse of CardsSomething Happened on the Way To HeavensThe Magic Drum and Other Favorite StoriesThe Bird with the Golden WingsHow The Sea Became SaltyHow The Onion got its layersThe Upside Down King The Daughter From A Wishing TreeGrandma's Bag of StoriesGrandparents Bag of StoriesThe Sage With Two HornsDollar Bahu The Gopi Diaries ''

See also
 List of Indian writers

References

External links

 

1951 births
Living people
Writers from Bangalore
Indian women children's writers
Indian children's writers
Kannada people
Recipients of the Padma Shri in social work
English-language writers from India
People from Haveri district
Social workers
Kannada-language writers
Scientists from Bangalore
Indian computer scientists
Indian women computer scientists
Indian women novelists
Indian Institute of Science alumni
Indian women engineers
20th-century Indian novelists
20th-century Indian engineers
Engineers from Karnataka
21st-century Indian novelists
20th-century Indian women writers
21st-century Indian engineers
21st-century Indian women writers
21st-century Indian women scientists
20th-century Indian women scientists
Women writers from Karnataka
Women scientists from Karnataka
Novelists from Karnataka
Social workers from Karnataka
Women educators from Karnataka
Educators from Karnataka
20th-century women engineers
21st-century women engineers
Murthy family
Madhva Brahmins
Karnatak University alumni
Recipients of the Padma Bhushan in social work